Long Barn is a census-designated place (CDP) in Tuolumne County, California. The 2010 United States census reported Long Barn's population was 155.

Long Barn is located roughly 4 miles northeast of Mi-Wuk Village off State Route 108.

History

Long Barn was a wagon stop along the Sonora Pass during the 1800s gold rush era. Pioneers traveling west would stop at "The Long Barn" where they could refresh supplies, food and rest. There is an apple orchard that was planted next to the Long Barn so that travelers could have fresh food; the apple orchard is still there. The Long Barn was torn down in the early 1970s.

The Long Barn Lodge was built in the 1920s, which included a restaurant, rooms, bar and entertainment for vacationers in the mountains. Heralded as the Four Seasons Resort along the area called Sonora Pass Vacationland, the lodge grew to include a pool, horseback riding, ice skating, hiking and more.

The historic Long Barn Lodge, the old lodge, restaurant, game room and bar burned down in 2002, and due to lack of insurance was not rebuilt. The Long Barn Lodge is still open today, with motel rooms, cabins, ice skating, swimming pool and events.

Geography
According to the United States Census Bureau, the CDP covers an area of 2.9 square miles (7.5 km2), 99.95% of it land and 0.05% of it water.

Climate
The Köppen Climate System classifies Long Barn as having a Warm-summer Mediterranean climate, abbreviated as "Csb".

Demographics
The 2010 United States Census reported that Long Barn had a population of 155. The racial makeup of Long Barn was 140 (90.3%) White, 1 (0.6%) African American, 3 (1.9%) Native American, 0 (0.0%) Asian, 0 (0.0%) Pacific Islander, 5 (3.2%) from other races, and 6 (3.9%) from two or more races. Hispanic or Latino of any race were 13 persons (8.4%).

The Census reported that 155 people (100% of the population) lived in households, 0 (0%) lived in non-institutionalized group quarters, and 0 (0%) were institutionalized.

There were 81 households, out of which 13 (16.0%) had children under the age of 18 living in them, 31 (38.3%) were opposite-sex married couples living together, 9 (11.1%) had a female householder with no husband present, 4 (4.9%) had a male householder with no wife present.  There were 4 (4.9%) unmarried opposite-sex partnerships, and 0 (0%) same-sex married couples or partnerships. 31 households (38.3%) were made up of individuals, and 11 (13.6%) had someone living alone who was 65 years of age or older. The average household size was 1.91.  There were 44 families (54.3% of all households); the average family size was 2.48.

The population was spread out, with 23 people (14.8%) under the age of 18, 9 people (5.8%) aged 18 to 24, 25 people (16.1%) aged 25 to 44, 64 people (41.3%) aged 45 to 64, and 34 people (21.9%) who were 65 years of age or older.  The median age was 54.3 years. For every 100 females, there were 115.3 males.  For every 100 females age 18 and over, there were 106.3 males.

The homeowner vacancy rate was 1.8%; the rental vacancy rate was 17.6%.  107 people (69.0% of the population) lived in owner-occupied housing units and 48 people (31.0%) lived in rental housing units.

References

Census-designated places in Tuolumne County, California
Populated places in the Sierra Nevada (United States)